The Phillips River is an ephemeral river in the Goldfields-Esperance region of Western Australia.

The river finally discharges into Culham Inlet and, when the inlet is open to the ocean, into the Southern Ocean.

There are six tributaries, including West River, Jackilup Creek, Yarracarrup Creek and Kybalup Creek.

The river's catchment is 35% cleared, with the southern half lying within the boundaries of the Fitzgerald River National Park. The entire catchment lies within the Fitzgerald River Biosphere.

Phillips River flows for only a short time each year, mostly during the (southern) winter months in the middle of the year. The river water is naturally saline but varies from almost fresh to more saline then seawater.

The river was named by John Septimus Roe, who made the first recorded sighting of the river in 1848, after his son in law, Samuel Pole Phillips.

From 1892, it was the site of a goldrush. A de facto town, known initially as Phillips River, sprang up. In 1901, the town was gazetted under the name Ravensthorpe.

References

Rivers of the Goldfields-Esperance region